The Gifford Rosenwald School is a historic school building at 6146 Columbia Highway in Gifford, South Carolina.  It was built in 1920 with funding from the Rosenwald Fund for the education of African Americans.  Its design is not based on standard Rosenwald plans, but on a standard two-room plan published by state Board of Education.  Originally segregated to African Americans it was integrated in 1958.

The building was listed on the National Register of Historic Places in 2017.

See also
National Register of Historic Places listings in Hampton County, South Carolina

References

African-American history of South Carolina
School buildings on the National Register of Historic Places in South Carolina
School buildings completed in 1920
National Register of Historic Places in Hampton County, South Carolina
Buildings and structures in Hampton County, South Carolina
Rosenwald schools in South Carolina
1920 establishments in South Carolina